Gekko intermedium, also known as the intermediate flying gecko or Philippine flying gecko, is a species of gecko. It is endemic to the Philippines.

References 

Gekko
Reptiles of the Philippines
Endemic fauna of the Philippines
Reptiles described in 1915
Taxa named by Edward Harrison Taylor